Emerson Center is an unincorporated community in Cotton County, Oklahoma, United States. A post office operated in Emerson from 1908 to 1914. The community was located six miles west of Walters.

References

Unincorporated communities in Cotton County, Oklahoma
Unincorporated communities in Oklahoma